Easton Historic District may refer to:
 Easton Historic District (Easton, Maryland), listed on the NRHP in Maryland
 North Easton Historic District, Easton, Massachusetts, listed on the NRHP in Massachusetts
 Easton Historic District (Easton, Pennsylvania), listed on the NRHP in Pennsylvania